East Is East may refer to:

 "East is East", a quotation from Rudyard Kipling's poem "The Ballad of East and West"
 East Is East (1916 film), a 1916 British silent film
 East Is East (novel), a 1990 novel by T.C. Boyle
 East Is East (play), a 1996 play by Ayub Khan-Din, produced by Tamasha Theatre Company
 East Is East (1999 film), a 1999 BAFTA Award-winning film based on the play